Brian Weatherson is the Marshall Weinberg Professor of Philosophy at the University of Michigan.  He specializes in epistemology and philosophy of language.

Education and career

Born in Australia, Weatherson received his PhD from Monash University in 1998, with a dissertation on formal models for reasoning under uncertainty, titled "On Uncertainty."

Prior to joining the Michigan department in 2012, he was an associate professor at Cornell University (2008–2011) and Rutgers University (2011–2012), and also taught at Brown University (2004–2007) and Syracuse University (1999–2001).

He runs a philosophy-themed blog, "Thoughts, Arguments, and Rants" and is a contributing member of the political blog Crooked Timber.

See also
 American philosophy
 List of American philosophers

References

External links
 Thoughts, Arguments, and Rants
 Crooked Timber

Australian philosophers
American philosophers
Philosophers of language
Cornell University faculty
Year of birth missing (living people)
Monash University alumni
Brown University faculty
Syracuse University faculty
Rutgers University faculty
Philosophy academics
Living people
University of Michigan faculty
Epistemologists